Guldin Mill, also known as Lauer's Mill, is an historic grist mill and national historic district located in Maidencreek Township, Berks County, Pennsylvania. 

It was listed on the National Register of Historic Places in 1990.

History and architectural features
This historic district encompasses one contributing building and one contributing site. The house and mill form a combined structure. The house was built in 1781; the mill was built in 1822. It is a two-and-one-half-story, stone building, which measures forty-two feet by eight feet. 

The mill continued to operate into the 1950s.

Also located on the property are watercourses, which consist of the headrace, two ponds and the tail race.

Gallery

References

Grinding mills in Berks County, Pennsylvania
Grinding mills on the National Register of Historic Places in Pennsylvania
Houses completed in 1781
Industrial buildings completed in 1822
Houses in Berks County, Pennsylvania
Historic districts on the National Register of Historic Places in Pennsylvania
National Register of Historic Places in Berks County, Pennsylvania
1822 establishments in Pennsylvania